The 2023 Bryant Bulldogs football team will represent Bryant University as members of the Big South Conference in the 2023 NCAA Division I FCS football season. The Bulldogs, are led by fifth-year head coach Chris Merritt, they play their home games at Beirne Stadium in Smithfield, Rhode Island.

Previous season

The Bulldogs finished the 2022 season with an overall record of 4–7 and a mark of 2–3 in conference play to place in a three-way tie for third in the Big South.

Schedule

References

Bryant
Bryant Bulldogs football seasons
Bryant Bulldogs football